Mikhail Vladimirovich Belov (born 10 December 1966) is a Russian professional football coach and a former player.

Playing career
As a player, he made his debut in the Soviet Second League in 1989 for FC Zvezda Gorodishche.

Honours

Individual
 Russian Professional Football League Zone best coach (for work with FC Nosta Novotroitsk) (2018–19).

References

1966 births
Living people
Soviet footballers
Russian footballers
FC Rotor Volgograd players
FC Tekstilshchik Kamyshin players
FC Energiya Volzhsky players
FC KAMAZ Naberezhnye Chelny players
Russian football managers
Russian Premier League players
FC Torpedo Moscow managers
FC KAMAZ Naberezhnye Chelny managers
FC Mordovia Saransk players
Sportspeople from Volgograd
Association football midfielders
Association football defenders
FC Znamya Truda Orekhovo-Zuyevo players
FC Nosta Novotroitsk players